Robert Digby, 1st Baron Digby (died 6 June 1642), was an Anglo-Irish peer.

Digby was the son of Sir Robert Digby of Coleshill, Warwickshire, and Lettice FitzGerald, of Geashill, Ireland, granddaughter of Gerald FitzGerald, 11th Earl of Kildare. John Digby, 1st Earl of Bristol, was his uncle, and Essex Digby, Bishop of Dromore, his brother. Digby notably served as Governor of King's County in Ireland. In 1620, he was raised to the Peerage of Ireland as Baron Digby, of Geashill. He married, firstly, Lady Sarah Boyle, daughter of Richard Boyle, 1st Earl of Cork, and Catherine Fenton; this marriage produced a son, Kildare Digby (c. 1627 – 1661). Digby married secondly, Elizabeth Altham, daughter of Sir James Altham and his second wife, Mary Stapers. Digby died in 1642 and was succeeded in the barony by his son Kildare.

References

Year of birth missing
1642 deaths
Robert
Eldest sons of British hereditary barons
Peers of Ireland created by James I
Robert 01